The Dart Glacier is an approximately  glacier located in Mount Aspiring National Park, in the upper reaches of Otago, New Zealand.

Geography
The Dart Glacier has a fairly typical morphology, including a clearly defined névé and a main trunk, separated by a small icefall. The névé is located in a basin at the eastern end of the Snowdrift Range, between Plunket Dome, Islington Dome and Mount Māori. From here, the glacier turns again to the southwest, before quickly reaching its terminus and the start of the Dart River / Te Awa Whakatipu. Like the larger Haupapa / Tasman Glacier, the lower reaches of the Dart are covered in debris from past rockfalls on the surrounding mountains, obscuring the ice and giving it a grey colour. 

The topography and climate of the Dart Glacier make it particularly responsive to changes in conditions. Fieldwork during the 1980s also discovered pockets of ice from the glacier buried beneath a layer of gravel  in the Dart Valley, near where the glacier's terminus would have been in the late 19th century.

History
While the upper Dart Valley and headwaters of Te Awa Whakatipu were a prominent source of Pounamu for early Māori, there are no oral records of the Dart Glacier from this early exploration. The first confirmed European sighting of the glacier came from Patrick Quirk Caples, a prospector exploring the area for gold during the 1860s. The glacier was further explored in the 1910s by Bernard Head, who led an expedition over the nearby Cascade Saddle before returning three years later to survey the upper Dart Valley. Researchers studying the glacier in the 1970s were based out of a small hut which had been helicoptered into the area to the support the study, and which was removed following its conclusion. This work claimed that, at the rate of retreat they observed, they claimed that the glacier below the icefall would have disappeared by the year 2000. Recent study of the Dart has involved sampling rocks from in front of the retreating glacier to determine exposure to cosmic rays.

References

Glaciers of New Zealand
Mount Aspiring National Park